Charlottesville is an unincorporated community in Hancock and Rush counties in the U.S. state of Indiana.  The Hancock County portion is in Jackson Township, while the Rush County portion is in Ripley Township.

History
Charlottesville was laid out and platted in 1830. The community's name most likely was a transfer from Charlottesville, Virginia. It was for a time incorporated as a town, from 1867.

The Charlottesville post office has been in operation since 1831.

Geography

Transportation

Major Roads
 U.S. Route 40
 I-70

Education

Eastern Hancock Community School Corporation services the towns of Charlottesville, Wilkinson, Shirley, Warrington, and surrounding areas in eastern Hancock County. It consists of one elementary school (Grades K - 5), one middle school (Grades 6 - 8), and one high school (Grades 9 - 12).

References

Unincorporated communities in Hancock County, Indiana
Unincorporated communities in Rush County, Indiana
Unincorporated communities in Indiana
Indianapolis metropolitan area
1830 establishments in Indiana